Belarus has participated in the Junior Eurovision Song Contest in every edition since its inception in  until . The Belarusian Television and Radio Company (BTRC), then a member organisation of the European Broadcasting Union (EBU), has been responsible for the selection process of its participants since its debut.

The first representative to participate for the nation at the 2003 contest was Volha Satsiuk with the song "Tantsuy", which finished in fourth place out of sixteen participating entries, achieving a score of 103 points.

History

Belarus was one of the sixteen countries to have made their debut at the inaugural Junior Eurovision Song Contest 2003, which took place on 15 November 2003 at the Forum in Copenhagen, Denmark. Belarusian Television and Radio Company (BTRC) hold a national final mechanism in order to select its representative for the contests. Child-singer Volha Satsiuk was the first participant to represent Belarus with the song "", which finished in fourth place out of sixteen participating entries, achieving a score of one hundred and three points.

Viewing figures and interest for the Junior Eurovision in Belarus is very high; according to former EBU Executive Supervisor Svante Stockselius in 2010, Junior Eurovision was then considered "one of Belarus' most popular television shows". On 8 June 2009, the EBU confirmed that Belarus had won the rights to organise the Junior Eurovision Song Contest 2010 over bids from Russia and Malta; after undergoing construction in 2009, the 15,000-spectator Minsk-Arena hosted the event.

On 17 May 2016, Belarus confirmed that the country would be making its fourteenth Junior Eurovision appearance at the  contest. The national selection show took place on 26 August 2016, in which ten acts competed in a live televised broadcast, with the winner having been determined by 50% professional jury and 50% public televoting. Alexander Minyonok won the 2016 Belarusian final with the song "" and represented Belarus at the 2016 contest. On 15 October 2017, it was announced that Belarus would host the contest for a second time in the capital, Minsk. On 21 November 2017, Belarus' Deputy Prime Minister  stated that the contest was scheduled to be held at Minsk Arena in November 2018. On 18 March 2018, Minsk Arena was confirmed as the venue by the contest organisers.

On 28 May 2021, the EBU announced it was suspending BTRC's membership due to "exceptional concerns" over its broadcasts. The broadcaster was given two weeks to respond before the suspension came into effect, which it failed to do publicly. Exclusion from EBU membership meant that BTRC would lose the rights to broadcast and participate in Eurovision events. On 1 July, the EBU officially imposed a three-year suspension on BTRC, scheduled to end on 1 July 2024, and the broadcaster subsequently acknowledged and accepted its temporary inability to take part in Eurovision. Following this, the director general of BTRC, Ivan Eismont, made a statement regarding the EBU's actions, in which he claimed that the national response to Belarus' exclusion from the adult contest was ambivalent, but that there was general sadness regarding their inability to compete at the junior contest after their success at the event over the years. The EBU has the right to review the suspension at any point prior to its official expiration, though the likelihood of this happening is uncertain.

Participation overview

Commentators and spokespersons

The contests are broadcast online worldwide through the official Junior Eurovision Song Contest website junioreurovision.tv and YouTube. In 2015, the online broadcasts featured commentary in English by junioreurovision.tv editor Luke Fisher and 2011 Bulgarian Junior Eurovision Song Contest entrant Ivan Ivanov.

The Belarusian broadcaster, BTRC, sent its own commentators to each contest in order to provide commentary in the Russian language. Spokespersons were also chosen by the national broadcaster in order to announce the awarding points from Belarus. The table below list the details of each commentator and spokesperson since 2003.

Hostings

See also
Belarus in the Eurovision Song Contest – Senior version of the Junior Eurovision Song Contest.
Belarus in the Eurovision Young Dancers – A competition organised by the EBU for younger dancers aged between 16 and 21.
Belarus in the Eurovision Young Musicians – A competition organised by the EBU for musicians aged 18 years and younger.
Belarus in the Turkvision Song Contest – A contest for countries and regions which are of Turkic-speaking or Turkic ethnicity.

References 

 
Countries in the Junior Eurovision Song Contest
Belarusian music
Music competitions in Belarus